Rote Island (also spelled Roti) is an island of Indonesia, part of the East Nusa Tenggara province of the Lesser Sunda Islands. According to legend, this island got its name accidentally when a lost Portuguese sailor arrived and asked a farmer where he was. The surprised farmer, who could not speak Portuguese, introduced himself, "Rote".

Geography 
Rote lies 500 km (310.686 miles) northwest of the Australian coast and 150 km (105.633 miles) north of the Ashmore and Cartier Islands. The island is situated to the southwest of the larger island of Timor. To the north is the Savu Sea, and to the south is the Timor Sea. To the west lie Savu and Sumba. Along with some other nearby small islands, such as Nuse Island, Ndao island, it forms the kabupaten (regency) of Rote Ndao Regency, which in 2010 decennial census recorded a population of 119,711.

The main town, Ba'a, is located on the northern side of the island. Rote has a good surf area in the south, around the village of Nembrala.

For the most part, the island is covered by grassland and palms. This island experiences tropical savanna climate (Aw) with dry months for much of the year because of the dry winds that blow from mainland Australia. The main rainfall usually occurs between November and March. Between 80% to 95% of all rain falls during the wet west monsoon period and with little or no rain falling between July and October. The mean rainfall for Rote Island is around 1,200 to 1,300 mm annually. During the dry season, many streams and rivers run dry and local inhabitants must rely only on wells for their water supplies.

Transportation 
There is a daily ferry to the island from Kupang, the provincial capital on West Timor, which provides transport for local passengers and goods as well as tourists. The trip between Kupang and Ba'a takes around two hours. The ferry leaves at 8.30 AM and costs 80,000 Indonesian rupiah.

Wings Air operates daily flights between Rote's David Constantijn Saudale Airport and Kupang's El Tari International Airport. Flight time is about 30 minutes.

Rote consists of rolling hills, terraced plantations, acacia palm, savanna and some forests.

Economy 

The Rotinese depend, like the Savunese, on the lontar palm not only for basic survival but also as a supplement to their income from fishing and jewelry making.

Agriculture is the main form of employment. Fishing is also important, especially in the eastern village of Papela (east of Londalusi in the map), which has led to disputes with Australia over the water between them.

Tourist attractions 
Rote has many historical relics including fine antique Chinese porcelain, as well as ancient arts and traditions. Several prominent Indonesian figures were born in Rote. A popular music instrument, Sasando, is made of palm leaves.

In the eastern part of the island is a pond in Landu Village that has non-poisonous jellyfish. The pond also has a white sandy beach.

Rote Island, also known as Rote Ndao, is an island consisting of 96 small islands and 6 of them are inhabited. Many islands have natural beaches and other natural and frequent tourism, but so far only local tourists often come to Rote. 10 of the most famous tourist attractions in Rote that are Bo'a beach, Nemberala beach, Lutu Babatu beach, Falii water located in West Rote, Oesosole beach in East Rote, Termanu stone in central Rote, Laguna Nirwana in Southwest Rote, Oekode Waterfall, Zero Point Rote and Inaoe beach in South Rote.

Culture 
The ti'i langga is a traditional hat with a horn-like protrusion at the top that is a symbol of Rote cultural identity.

There are many languages spoken on the island, all related to the languages on nearby Timor island. These languages are: Bilba, Dengka, Lole, Ringgou, Dela-Oenale, Termanu, and Tii.

Trivia 
The critically endangered Rote Island snake-necked turtle is endemic to Rote Island.

The US-born Australian scholar, James J. Fox, has written extensively about Rotinese culture.

Gallery

See also 

 Islands of Indonesia
 Rotenese languages

References

Further reading
 James J. Fox's book – 

Lesser Sunda Islands
Rote Ndao Regency
Landforms of East Nusa Tenggara
Outer Banda Arc
Islands of Indonesia